Efigenio Ferrer Cabrera (January 1, 1915 – August 17, 1963), nicknamed "Coco" and "Al", was a Puerto Rican Negro league shortstop who played in the 1940s. 

A native of Juana Díaz, Puerto Rico, Ferrer played for the Puerto Rico national baseball team in the 1938 Central American and Caribbean Games. He made his Negro leagues debut in 1946 with the Indianapolis Clowns, and played three seasons for Indianapolis before going on to play for the Chicago American Giants in 1951. Ferrer died in Ponce, Puerto Rico in 1963 at age 48.

References

External links
 and Seamheads
 Efigenio 'Coco' Ferrer at Negro League Baseball Players Association

1915 births
1963 deaths
Chicago American Giants players
Indianapolis Clowns players
Baseball shortstops
Puerto Rican baseball players
Competitors at the 1938 Central American and Caribbean Games